Juan Segundo Olivares Marambio (born February 20, 1941) is a retired Chilean football goalkeeper.

Career
At club level, Olivares played for Santiago Wanderers, Magallanes, Cobreloa and Unión Española. At international level, Olivares played for the Chile national team between 1965 and 1974, gaining 33 caps. He was part of the Chile squad for the 1966 and 1974 world cups.

References

External links
 
 

1941 births
Living people
Chilean footballers
Association football goalkeepers
Chile international footballers
1966 FIFA World Cup players
1974 FIFA World Cup players
Santiago Wanderers footballers
Unión Española footballers
Magallanes footballers